United Kingdom Space Command (UKSC) is a joint command of the British Armed Forces organised under the Royal Air Force, and staffed by personnel from the Royal Navy, British Army, Royal Air Force and the British Civil Service. The UKSC has three functions: space operations, space workforce generation, and space capability.

UK Space Command was established 1 April 2021 under the command of Air Vice-Marshal Paul Godfrey. Godfrey is of equal rank to the commanders of the RAF's Groups. The new command has "responsibility for not just operations, but also generating, training and growing the force, and also owning the money and putting all the programmatic rigour into delivering new ... capabilities." UKSC headquarters is at RAF High Wycombe co-located with Air Command.

When fully operationally capable, UK Space Command will "provide command and control of all of Defence’s space capabilities, including [the] UK Space Operations Centre, Skynet (satellite) communications, RAF Fylingdales, and other enabling capabilities."

Defence Command Paper and Space Strategy
In a March 2021 Defence Command Paper it was announced that part of the additional £1.4 billion allocated to support UK Space Command over the next decade would be used to develop a new Intelligence, Surveillance and Reconnaissance (ISR) satellite capability, following on from the Carbonite-2 technology demonstrator launched in 2018.

On 22 April 2021 it was announced that Air Commodore Mark Flewin was to become Head Operations, Plans & Training, United Kingdom Space Command, Royal Air Force High Wycombe in May 2021. 

As of 2021 Commodore David C. Moody (Engineering Branch, RN) was posted in as Head of Space Capability for UK Space Command.

In February 2022, the first part of the Defence Space Strategy was published, which included the already announced extra investment of £1.4 billion over 10 years mostly for the development of the multi-satellite surveillance and intelligence ISTARI system. The strategy announced that the UK would adopt an "international by design" approach, and is the first state to publicly join the U.S. led Operation Olympic Defender, enabling international sharing of space resources and the synchronisation of space efforts. The UK will strengthen relations with the Five Eyes intelligence partnership.

Operational concept demonstrator satellites for the ISTARI system, with electro-optical sensors and onboard processing, are planned for launch in 2024, under project MINERVA.

See also
 
 British space programme
 Defence Intelligence Fusion Centre
 RAF Oakhanger in Hampshire (1001 Signals Unit RAF), satellite communications site where Skynet was directed from until commercialisation in 2003
 Air Vice-Marshal Harvey Smyth; Director Space, UK

References

Joint commands of the United Kingdom
Space units and formations
Military units and formations established in 2021